North Franklin Township may refer to:

North Franklin Township, Franklin County, Nebraska, in Franklin County, Nebraska
North Franklin Township, Washington County, Pennsylvania

Township name disambiguation pages